Eric Mason (died 7 June 2010) was a British actor. Originally a stevedore working at Surrey Docks, he sustained a back injury in a road accident and end up taking an acting career. He made his theatrical debut in Gentle Jack by Robert Bolt, starring Dame Edith Evans.

His television credits include: Z-Cars, Dixon of Dock Green, Doctor Who, Bergerac, Sea of Souls, Auf Wiedersehen, Pet, Minder in episode Come in T-64, Your Time Is Ticking Away and The Bill.

He had a notable role in Hot Fuzz. He played the husband of Billie Whitelaw's character, and was involved in the film's climax, where he fought Simon Pegg. He also played the masked executioner in the 1966 film A Man for All Seasons.

Note: The date of birth being 12 February 1927 is incorrect as that in fact applies to the American actor Ernesto Macias (1927-2017), who sometimes went credited as Eric Mason, hence the confusion.

Filmography

References

External links
 
 Eric Mason/Erik Mason at Theatricalia

2010 deaths
British male television actors
Date of birth missing